Girls in Love is a British teen drama television series produced by Granada Television which aired on CITV. It is based on the 1997 novel of the same name, both created by English author Jacqueline Wilson. The show ran for two series from 1 April 2003 until 20 May 2005. It was filmed in Manchester, United Kingdom.

Plot
Three teenage girls — Ellie (Hallinan), Magda (Abrahams) and Nadine (Kwolek) — are best friends that go through the somewhat weird and wonderful world of boys together. The show is narrated by Ellie, and normally portrays her life events in her sketchbook, which blends the show's live action with animation in a similar manner to the US teen sitcom Lizzie McGuire. She lives with her father and his girlfriend (later wife) Anna, and her youngest half-brother Benedict "Eggs".

Cast
 Olivia Hallinan as Eleanor ”Ellie” Allard, narrated from her perspective, often told through her drawings and writings in her journal. Her mother died when she was 5 years old.
 Zaraah Abrahams as Magda Burton, also one of Ellie and Nadine's best friends, after they met in high school. She attracts boys and has a loud personality.
 Amy Kwolek as Nadine Foster, Ellie's best friend since they were little. She is said to have a "wild child" reputation and is also goth.
 Ian Dunn as Mark Allard, Ellie's father, widowed when her mother died, remarried to Anna.
 Sam Loggin as Anna Allard, Ellie's stepmother, much younger than her father. Ellie and Anna soon start to be friends after having their ups and downs in the first few episodes.
 Adam Paul Harvey as Russell, Ellie's boyfriend then later her ex-boyfriend. Like Ellie, he is interested in art. Is in year eleven at his school, Halmer High. Becomes Ellie's ex-boyfriend in the episode "The Unforgiven" after Russell cheats on Ellie. They almost get back together in episode "The Ex Factor" but Russell cheats on her again.
 Dale Barker as Greg, Magda's on-and-off again boyfriend.
 Nick Schofield as Liam, Nadine's sleazy, but extremely good-looking, ex-boyfriend who had a reputation for using girls for sex.
 Tom Woodland as Dan, Ellie's "kind-of" boyfriend before Russell. He should be in Year 8, but because of his intelligence he was moved up a year, to Year 9. They met at during the summer holidays but Ellie and Dan split up and Dan gets another girlfriend.
 Alp Haydar as Darius, new American exchange student that becomes friends with Ellie, Magda and Nadine. Magda and Ellie both develop crushes on Darius, and Magda and Darius eventually go out but it doesn't work out, and in the last episode at a school dance Ellie and Darius kiss (which Magda doesn't mind).
 Gemma Wolk as Natasha, Nadine's spoiled, manipulative younger sister.
 Julian Kay as Mr Green, Ellie, Magda and Nadine's art teacher, who Magda has a crush on.
 Clare Wille as Miss Henderson, Ellie, Magda and Nadine's tutor and P.E teacher in year 9. She is usually strict and often unfair on the girls.

Episodes

Series 1 (2003)

Series 2 (2005)

Telecast and home release 
Girls in Love was repeated for the first time since 2005 on CITV's digital channel from September 2010. The TV series was also repeated on Australia's children channel ABC3 in 2010 and most recently repeated in June 2016. In America, it aired on Showtime Family Zone. As of 2022, there are no streaming releases.

VHS/DVD (Region 2) 
 VHS – Video Collection International Ltd./DVD – ITV Studios Home Entertainment.
 Girls in Love (DVD – 29 Dec. 2003) – My Big Lie, Getting Lippy, How to Look Eighteen, Drop the Boy, and Express Yourself
 Girls in Love 2 (DVD – 17 May 2004) – Girls Out Late, Two's Company, The Secret Diary of Ellie Allard, and Girls in Trouble
 Girls in Tears (DVD – 18 April 2005) – Birthday Girl, Life Experience, The L-Word, and The Unforgiven
 The Jacqueline Wilson Collection (DVD – 17 October 2005) – Girls in Love (episodes 1–5, Girls in Love 2 (episodes 10–13), Girls in Tears (episodes 1–4), and New Friends.
The DVD releases are episodes strung into movies with music changes, due to copyright reasons. The remaining 4 episodes of Series 1 and the last 9 shows of Series 2 have not had official DVD releases, probably due to music rights issues and poor sales.

References

External links
 
 Jacqueline Wilson's official website 

2000s British drama television series
2000s British teen television series
2000s teen drama television series
2003 British television series debuts
2005 British television series endings
British teen drama television series
English-language television shows
ITV television dramas
Television series about teenagers
Television shows based on British novels
Television shows produced by Granada Television
Television series by ITV Studios
Television shows set in London
Television shows set in Manchester